Murrami is a village located in the Leeton Shire in New South Wales, Australia. Murrami has a post office, a rice storage facility, and a small community centre and park. The Freedom Foods Factory is located nearby as is DUXTON NUTS. The place name is derived from an aboriginal word for 'crayfish'. A local tourist attraction is Rockinghorse Restorations. 
Murrami Post Office opened on 18 December 1922.

References

Leeton Shire
Towns in the Riverina
Towns in New South Wales